Sports in Jordan are important to the country's culture. Games, self-defense, swimming, diving, tennis, labour and equestrian sports are all eagerly accepted by young people as sports.

Football

Football is the most popular sport in Jordan. In every area, from Khalda all the way to Al Hashimi Al-Janoobiah, most people on every street play football. Football is becoming increasingly popular in Jordan, especially because of the large recent improvements in Jordan's national football team. The national football team reached 37th in September 2004 according to the FIFA Rankings. Little Leagues and Youth Clubs related to football are also very popular in Jordan, some of which are supervised and run by the Jordan Football Association.

The Jordan League which is similar to the English Premier League, attracts reasonable crowds each week once the season has begun. The league which began in 1944 has seen huge growth in the past decade, with new teams, improved players, new stadiums and highly paid Managers. Under the Jordan League is the Second Division Jordan League. However the bottom two teams in the first division get relegated at the end of the season, whilst the top two teams in the second division are promoted. In doing this it gives teams in the second division a bigger motivation to do well in the league, whilst at the same time makes sure that teams in the first division always try their best to avoid relegation.

In the 2008/2009 season the teams in the first division were:

 Al-Arabi (Irbid)
 Al-Baqa'a SC
 Al-Faisaly (Amman)
 Al-Hussein (Irbid)
 Al-Jazeera (Amman)
 Al-Wahdat SC
 Shabab Al-Hussein
 Shabab Al-Ordon
 Al-Yarmouk FC (Promoted from second level)
 Ittihad Al-Ramtha (Promoted from second level)
 Al-Ahli (Amman)
 Al-Ramtha SC

Rugby

Rugby is on the rise in Jordan and many people are playing and watching it.
There are four clubs in Jordan: Amman Citadel Rugby Club,Nomads Rugby Club, Aqaba Sharks and Amman Saracens

Jordan Rugby Official Website
Amman Citadel Rugby Club Website

Basketball

Major improvements are also occurring in basketball in Jordan. Jordan's national basketball team is now being sponsored by Zain and participating in various Arab and Middle East basketball competitions. Local teams include: Al-Orthodoxi Club, Al-Riyadi, Zain, Al-Hussein and Al-Jazeera.

Skateboarding
Skateboarding is recently becoming popular in Jordan after the construction of 7Hills Skatepark in Amman.

Cycling

Although cycling is not a very famous sport in Jordan, the sport is developing rapidly as a lifestyle and a new way to travel and explore the country especially among the youth.

The governing body of cycling in Jordan is the Jordanian Cycling Federation (JCF).

The cycling clubs in Jordan are: 

 Cycling Jordan
 Bike Rush
 Nader Bikes

See also
 Jordan at the Olympics
 Jordan at the Paralympics

References

External links